Davydovo is a rural locality (a village) in Posyolok Krasnoye Ekho, Gus-Khrustalny District, Vladimir Oblast, Russia. The population was 11 as of 2010.

Geography 
Davydovo is located on the Sudogda River, 31 km northeast of Gus-Khrustalny (the district's administrative centre) by road. Semyonovka is the nearest rural locality.

References 

Rural localities in Gus-Khrustalny District
Melenkovsky Uyezd